The Choco elaenia  or Choco gray elaenia (Myiopagis parambae) is a species of bird in the family Tyrannidae.  It is found from eastern Panama to northwestern Ecuador.  Its natural habitat is subtropical or tropical moist lowland forest.

References

Myiopagis
Birds described in 1904